Theodore H. Rowell, Sr. (July 15, 1905 – September 26, 1979) was a Minnesota pharmaceutical industrialist, an outdoorsman and conservationist, and politician.

Rowell was born in Watertown, Wisconsin, and was the great grandson of John S. Rowell of Beaver Dam, Wisconsin (1825–1907), noted pioneer inventor and manufacturer of farm machinery. He moved with his family to Chetlo Harbor, Washington in 1912 where his father Joseph C. N. Rowell and Uncle Douglas Rowell founded the Chetlo Harbor Packing Company, a salmon cannery. After canning 10,000 cases of salmon in 1914, the cannery failed in 1915, Ted and his family moved to Warroad, Minnesota, eventually settling at Wheeler's Point on Lake of the Woods, north of the town of Baudette, Minnesota.

Rowell studied pharmacy at the University of Minnesota, was Class President 1926-27; upon graduation in 1928, he returned to Baudette and opened a drugstore. His father Joe, who continued in commercial fishing, also raised blue foxes for their fur. When fur buyers commented on the quality of his foxes' furs, Joe figured it was in the food they were fed, a diet consisting primarily of burbot. The only fresh-water relative of the cod, the fish had no market value, but came up in his nets and were fed to the foxes.

Burbot Liver Oil and Rowell Laboratories, Inc.
Ted Rowell extracted oil from a burbot, and upon scientific assay, it was determined to be eight times more potent in vitamins A and D than cod liver oil, which was a big seller at the time. Ted and Joe thus formed the Burbot Liver Products Company in 1933, and began extracting, processing, bottling, and selling burbot liver oil. Over the years, the company became Rowell Laboratories, Inc., grew to manufacture more than 200 products, and became the largest industry and largest employer in Lake of the Woods county, adding multivitamins and minerals, and later becoming a national manufacturer of prescription drugs. Ted retired in 1966 and turned the direction of the company over to his son Ted, Jr. The company, later called Reid-Rowell Laboratories, has since become a subsidiary of Solvay Pharmaceuticals. Solvay, in 2008, sold the Baudette plants to ANI Pharmaceuticals where it stands today as a publicly traded company (ANIP).

Political career
Rowell was active in local and national politics, having served six years as Mayor of Baudette. During his term as mayor of Baudette, the city built a new hospital, sewage disposal plant, an international airport, a new city well system, and other projects. As Chairman of the International Bridge Committee, he successfully raised $1.6 million for construction of the International Bridge spanning the Rainy River, linking Baudette and Rainy River, Ontario. Ted started working on the bridge project in 1947 - the idea was sparked in a poker game. On May 24, 1955, Ted received a telegram from Senator Edward Thye telling him that the US Senate had just passed the bill authorizing  the building of the  traffic bridge across the Rainy River, linking Baudette, Minnesota with Rainy River, Ontario. After a dozen years of organizing and disappointments, construction was completed and the bridge was opened on July 1, 1960 before a crowd of 15,000 people. Hubert Humphrey, and Eugene McCarthy attended with WCCO radio covering the event. Ted was close personal friends with Minnesota Governor Luther Youngdahl, Governor Harold Edward Stassen, and Senator Edward John Thye. Ted was a delegate to the 1948 Republican National Convention, where his friend Harold Stassen was the hands-down favorite to receive that year's Republican nomination for president. As Ted tells it, at this point during the convention Harold was asked to meet with northeastern money people, who then proceed to tell him how things were going to be, some of which Harold would not agree with. From this event on, Dewey was pushed hard by the party, and the tide at the convention turned, and New York Governor Thomas Dewey received the nomination.

Other accomplishments
Rowell was named Minnesota Tree Farmer of the Year, Minnesota Small Businessman of the Year, and received the University's 1959 Outstanding Achievement Award. He was vice-chairman of the Minnesota Republican State Central Committee and a member of the Greater Upper Mississippi River Road Commission. In 1954 Rowell was honored for his outstanding achievements by being selected as the first Home Coming king of the University of Minnesota.

Theodore H. Rowell Graduate Fellowship
After Ted's death, the Rowell family set up the Theodore H. Rowell Graduate Fellowship at the University of Minnesota for graduate students in the College of Pharmacy. Grants range from $3,000 to $6,000 with preference to Minnesota residents who are US citizens.

Ted was married to Margaret Lawson in Warroad, Minnesota in 1929, and had two children, Ted, Jr, and Peggy. Rowell died September 26, 1979.

Rowell Laboratories, Inc. today
Rowell Laboratories, Inc. was re-incorporated in 2008 as a Florida corporation and has returned to its natural product roots, manufacturing safe and effective natural and homeopathic health care products under the NatureCare brand in a cGMP quality FDA manufacturing facility.

Publications

 Article, contributions. TH Rowell, Drug and Cosmetic Ind. (1947), vol. 63, No. 4, pp. 459, 460, 549 to 551.

Official Report of the Proceedings of the 24th Republican National Convention, Philadelphia 1948, Pg. 121.

Patents that reference "The Art of Coating Tablets" or other tableting articles written by Ted Rowell
Continuous Process - Tablets.  US Pat. 2955982 - Filed January 22, 1951
Coated Tablets.  US Pat. 2693436 - Filed February 27, 1951
Coated Tablets - The Upjohn Company.  US Pat. 2693437 - Filed February 27, 1951
Marked Pharmaceutical Tablets and Making Same.  US Pat. 3015609 - Filed January 26, 1953
Method Of Marking The Same.  US Pat. 2865810 - Filed October 7, 1955
Marked Pharmaceutical Tablet.  US Pat. 3015610 - Filed February 6, 1956
Method Of Printing Waxed Pellets.  US Pat. 2982234 - Filed October 4, 1957
Method Of Printing Waxed Pellets.  US Pat. 2925365 - Filed November 27, 1957
Coloring Solid Pharmaceutical Forms.  US Pat. 2925365 - Filed November 27, 1957
Process Of Coating Pharmaceutical.  US Pat. 3132074 - Filed May 28, 1959
Granulating And Coating Tablets.  US Pat. 3148123 - Filed May 17, 1960
Process For Coating Pharmaceutical Solid.  US Pat. 3607364 - Filed September 16, 1968.

References

External links
Rowell Laboratories, Inc. (A Florida corporation, inc. 2008) 
NatureCare  
A Historical Account of Research and Development of the use of Livers from the Fresh Water Burbot (by Evelyn C. Smith of Smith Bros. Fisheries)

1905 births
1979 deaths
University of Minnesota College of Pharmacy alumni
American manufacturing businesspeople
Politicians from Watertown, Wisconsin
People from Baudette, Minnesota
Mayors of places in Minnesota
Writers from Minnesota
Writers from Wisconsin
20th-century American businesspeople
20th-century American politicians